I Remember When I Was Pretty is the debut album of American indie rock band The Playing Favorites, which features members of Lagwagon, Sugarcult, Summercamp, Bad Astronaut and Popsicko. The album was released on December 4, 2007, via Suburban Home Records.

Track listing
 "Leavingtown" (3:39)
 "Everyone Else in The World" (2:33)
 "Good Years" (3:13)
 "Waiting" (4:42)
 "This Is the Last Train" (2:45)
 "Spill My Guts" (4:28)
 "Futuring" (1:33)
 "Indigenous" (3:25)
 "Drug Hugger" (3:30)
 "Stay" (2:21)
 "Whole Lotta Nothin'" (2:59)
 "The Problems Last" (3:28)
 "Wasteland" (2:18)
 "Citizen's Band" (4:57)

Personnel
 Joey Cape - guitar, vocals, keyboards, percussion
 Mick Flowers - drums, percussion
 Marko DeSantis - bass, vocals, guitar
 Luke Tierney - guitar, vocals, bass, keyboards
 Tim Cullen - guitar, vocals, bass, keyboards, percussion

References

2007 debut albums